Miami Revolution was an American women's soccer team, founded in 2005. The team was a member of the Women's Premier Soccer League, the third tier of women's soccer in the United States and Canada, until 2006, when the team left the league and the franchise was terminated.

The team played its home games at... 

The team's colors were...

Year-by-year

   

Women's Premier Soccer League teams
Women's soccer clubs in the United States
Revolution
2005 establishments in Florida
2006 disestablishments in Florida
Women's sports in Florida